John Robert Richards later Reid-Richards (born April 30, 1967) is an American singer-songwriter, musician, record producer and television and film composer. Richards was the original lead singer and principal songwriter for the alternative rock band Dishwalla.

Career

Dishwalla
Richards began his career as the lead singer of the alternative rock band Dishwalla. The band released their debut album Pet Your Friends in 1995. The album scored Dishwalla a #1 hit in 1996 with the Richards-penned "Counting Blue Cars". The song is well known for its lyrics, "Tell me all your thoughts on God, 'cause I'd really like to meet Her". Richards won a Billboard Music Award for Top Mainstream Rock Track of the Year. Along with one Gold Single and two Gold and Platinum albums, JR also won two ASCAP Awards for both having the Most Performed Song of The Year.

Dishwalla produced four other albums with Richards as lead singer and main songwriter, including And You Think You Know What Life's About in 1998, a live album called Live... Greetings from the Flow State and the 2002 album, Opaline. After Dishwalla completed their last album with Richards, Dishwalla in 2005, both bassist Scot Alexander and drummer Pete Maloney left the band. The band broke up shortly after their departures. In 2008, Dishwalla reformed with some original members returning and a new lead singer Justin Fox.

Solo career and other ventures
Richards started playing the piano and singing at age 5. He wrote his first song at age 9 and went on to study both Classical and Jazz until 18. At 20 years old, Richards began studying Bel Canto Opera technique under Ron Anderson and has continued studying since.

Richards’ debut solo album A Beautiful End was released in 2009 and debuted in the Top 50 on iTunes. In 2016, Richards released his second solo album, Honore et Amore, as well as an all acoustic album of songs he wrote while in Dishwalla, Stripped. Richards has released two albums since, the holiday EP "Angelgold " in 2018 and an album of covers called "Under The Cover" in 2019. JR is currently working on his 10th album to be released in 2020.

In January 2011, Richards created the 20k Watts project along with Leo and Ryan Rossi. 20k Watts is an Artist Eco Alliance which aims to bring sustainable clean energy to developing communities in need. To empower communities in impoverished areas using the sun, wind, and battery for storing and supplying electricity and enhancing the current and future quality of life. In 2013, the city of Los Angeles awarded Richards a proclamation for dedication to enhancing the lives of families in extreme poverty for his work in El Salvador with 20k Watts.

Richards has been producing since the 1990s and, along with Dishwalla, has gone on to produce other artists including Dom AD, Amy Grant, boudwin, Paddock, Awi Rafael and the British band BritRoyal. He also produced his solo albums as well as songs for the hit TV show, One Tree Hill (TV series), in 2009,  How I Met Your Mother, in 2012 and Criminal Minds, in 2013. In 2013, he wrote, produced and performed songs (including the theme song "White Light"), for TV series SAF3 airing in United States in 2013. In 2017, JR also wrote and recorded twenty songs for the newly re-booted version of "Baywatch". He has also appeared as an actor in the films, Charmed, Almost Anything, 2:13 and Morning (which he also scored).

Richards is currently a featured producer for Reid Richards Production, a music and film production company founded by his wife, Min Reid-Richards, in 2010. Reid Richards Productions also specializes in high-end music video production. In addition, Richards also works on voice, song writing and production techniques with various artists and musicians as well as lecturing at various University and Master Class music programs.

Discography

 TBD (2020)
 Under the Cover (2019)
 Stripped (2016)
 Honore et Amore (2015)
 A Beautiful End (2009)
 Dishwalla (2005)
 Live...Greetings (2003)
 Opaline (2002)
 And you think you know (1998)
 Pet your friends (1995)

Personal life
Richards is married to British director and sculptor Min Reid-Richards. The couple has four children.

Awards
 R&R No. 1 Record of the Year 1996
 R&R No. 1 Top 50 Active Rock Chart 5 Weeks in a row
 R&R No. 1 Top 50 Alternative Rock Chart 2 Weeks in a row
 R&R No. 1 Top 50 Rock Chart 2 Weeks in a row
 R&R Top 5 Hot AC Chart
 Billboard Award for Rock Track of the Year 1997
 Billboard No. 1 Heatseeker Album Track
 Billboard No. 1 Modern Rock Track
 Billboard No. 4 Top 40 Mainstream Track
 Billboard No. 5 Hot AC Track
 Billboard No. 15 Hot 100 Track
 RIAA Certified Gold Records – Pet Your Friends
 RIAA Certified Gold Single – Counting Blue Cars
 ASCAP Pop Music Award 1997
 ASCAP Pop Music Award 1998
 City of Los Angeles Proclamation for Dedication to Enhancing Lives of Families living in Extreme Poverty 2013

References

External links
 
 
 Reid Richards Productions Official site

1967 births
20th-century American musicians
21st-century American male actors
21st-century American musicians
Alternative rock singers
American alternative rock musicians
American film score composers
American indie rock musicians
American male film actors
American male guitarists
American male screenwriters
American male singer-songwriters
American rock songwriters
American television composers
Living people
Male actors from Santa Barbara, California
Musicians from Santa Barbara, California
Record producers from California
Singer-songwriters from California
Screenwriters from California
Guitarists from California
American male film score composers
20th-century American male musicians
21st-century American male musicians